Albert Saunders may refer to:

 Albert Charles Saunders (1874–1943), Canadian politician and jurist from Prince Edward Island
 Albert Bokhare Saunders (1880–1946), composer of romantic and light classical music